

Ancient militaries

Medieval and early modern

See also headgear listing within Components of medieval armour.

1914–1980

1980–present

See also
 Combat helmet

References

 
Headgear
Medieval helmets
Military uniforms
Body armor